Água Viva (English: Jellyfish) is a Brazilian telenovela produced and broadcast by Rede Globo in 1980.

Cast

Supporting cast 
Maria Eugênia Villarta - Cristina
Orion Ximenes - Valtinho
Ticiana Studart - Lia 
Izabella Bicalho - Francisquinha (orphan)
João Cláudio Melo - Paulo Roberto
Giovana Souto Maior - Patrícia

References

External links 
 

1980 telenovelas
Brazilian telenovelas
TV Globo telenovelas
1980 Brazilian television series debuts
1980 Brazilian television series endings
Telenovelas by Gilberto Braga
Television shows set in Rio de Janeiro (city)
Portuguese-language telenovelas